Gustavo Salgueiro de Almeida Correia also known as Gustavo (born July 7, 1984 in Maceió, Brazil) is a Brazilian footballer who most recently played for FC Edmonton of the North American Soccer League.

References

External links

1984 births
Living people
Brazilian footballers
Brazilian expatriate footballers
Sport Club do Recife players
Grêmio Barueri Futebol players
Agremiação Sportiva Arapiraquense players
Montedio Yamagata players
Widzew Łódź players
Expatriate footballers in Japan
Expatriate footballers in Poland
Expatriate footballers in Ukraine
FC Volyn Lutsk players
Brazilian expatriate sportspeople in Ukraine
Brazilian expatriate sportspeople in Poland
Expatriate soccer players in Canada
FC Edmonton players
J2 League players
North American Soccer League players
Association football forwards
People from Maceió
Sportspeople from Alagoas